Maurice L. Smith (born December 13, 1961) is a retired American kickboxer and mixed martial artist. In kickboxing, he held the WKC (World Kickboxing Council) world light heavyweight championship, the WKA (World Kickboxing Association) world heavyweight championship, and the ISKA (International Sport Karate Association) world heavyweight championship. In mixed martial arts, he held the Heavyweight championship in Battlecade Extreme Fighting and the UFC, and became a member of the UFC Hall of Fame in 2017. A professional competitor since 1980, Smith has formerly competed in kickboxing for the companies All Japan Enterprise and K-1, Pancrase, RINGS, PRIDE, Strikeforce, International Fight League and RFA.

Career 
Raised in Seattle, Washington, Smith got into martial arts at the age of 13 after watching Bruce Lee's Chinese Connection, and having had to retreat from a fight. He trained in karate, kung fu, and taekwondo, until he found the sport of kickboxing at age 18. Smith attended West Seattle High School, where he played football and participated in gymnastics.

Kickboxing career 
Smith won his first seven amateur kickboxing matches and then turned professional. His first fight was on March 4, 1982 against World Kickboxing Council's Light Heavyweight Champion Tony Morelli, who defeated him by decision after the seventh round. Seeing he had lost due to his lack of cardio, Smith started to train extensively to improve it, and fourteen months later, he went to his rematch as a new fighter. He then defeated Morelli by KO via roundhouse kick also in the seventh round, winning the championship.

Later that year, he was called for a non-title fight in Japan against the renowned Don "The Dragon" Wilson, and although Smith lost the fight, he had shown heads in the kickboxing world that he was on the way up. Maurice moved up a weight class and won the World Kickboxing Association Heavyweight Championship from Travis Everett, knocking him out via low kicks.

In 1984, Smith went to compete in Holland, beating Marcel Swank in the first round. Smith went ten straight years without a loss.

He also had a notable win in 1991 over Stan Longinidis who, at the time, was tearing through the ranks and was regarded as a super up and coming fighter. Maurice won this 12 round match by split decision after coming back from a knockdown in the first round by Stan and surviving an early onslaught.

In 1993, Smith was invited to the K-1 Grand Prix '93 along with seven of the world's best Light Heavyweight and Heavyweight kickboxers. Smith won his first match by defeating Japanese fighter Toshiyuki Atokawa in the quarterfinals by unanimous decision. In the semifinals he met Dutch fighter and future K-1 legend, Ernesto Hoost, where after a hard-fought battle Smith was knocked out by left highkick in the final round, ending his tournament.

Mixed martial arts career 
Smith had his first contact with mixed rules of fight, when he was invited in November 1989 by the Japanese professional wrestling promotion UWF Newborn. He was scheduled to face up-and-coming wrestler Masakatsu Funaki in a mixed rules fight, but his opponent got injured and was replaced with training partner Minoru Suzuki. During the fight, Smith kept negating Suzuki's takedown attempts by employing the pro wrestling-ruled rope scapes and a rudimentary sprawl ability, knocking him out several times with strike before finishing him with a right punch at the fourth round. The event sold out the Tokyo Dome and broke record gates. On October 4, 1992, Smith would face Funaki in an exhibition fight for Pro Wrestling Fujiwara Gumi, ending in a draw.

In 1993, Smith debuted for the mixed martial arts promotion Pancrase founded by Funaki and Suzuki. He took part in a kickboxing rules fight against Suzuki in the event Yes, We Are Hybrid Wrestlers 3. Later, he was scheduled to compete in a special rules MMA fight, in which the first and third rounds would be fought wearing boxing gloves, the second and fourth barehanded, and the fifth with only Smith wearing them. However, Smith lost the fight when Suzuki took him down at round 3 and made him tap to an armbar.

The next year, he took part in the King of Pancrase tournament. Maurice beat Takaku Fuke on the first round but fell to Ken Shamrock via arm triangle choke. He would go to lose twice to Bas Rutten, however his loss to Shamrock was more instrumental to his career, as he became friends with him and was sent to his dojo in United States, the Lion's Den, to learn proper MMA. There he met Frank Shamrock, who he formed a close relationship with. Shamrock and Smith worked synergistically; Shamrock, a submission specialist, improved Smith's ground game, while Smith in return improved Shamrock's striking. Along with Japanese fighter Tsuyoshi Kohsaka, who had befriended Frank after a fight between them in Fighting Network RINGS, Smith and Shamrock eventually formed their own MMA team, called the Alliance.

Smith joined Battlecade Extreme Fighting in 1996 to fight against the Heavyweight Champion Marcus "Conan" Silveira. Throughout the fight, Maurice showed excellent use of the sprawl technique which negated the Brazilian jiu-jitsu fighter's attempts at takedowns, as well as a remarkable submission defensive whenever Silveira was able to engage him on the ground. Smith then knocked out Silveira in the third round with a roundhouse kick to the head. In doing so, he became the Extreme Fighting Heavyweight Champion and became the first legitimate striker to win a top-end MMA event.

He then defended his title in the fourth show against judo and pro wrestling exponent Kazunari Murakami. Although Murakami surprisingly dropped Smith with a palm strike at the beginning, Smith escaped from his ground game and hit a barrage of leg kicks against the prone Japanese, and later knocked him out with a single punch. After the win, the company folded and Maurice joined the largest MMA promotion in the United States, the UFC.

At UFC 14 on July 27, 1997, Smith faced UFC Heavyweight Champion Mark Coleman in a title fight. Smith was considered to be a massive underdog for the bout, but shocked the mixed martial arts world with a unanimous decision victory to win the UFC Heavyweight Championship. With this win, Smith became the first striker to survive the attack of a world class wrestler. Through the use of an active guard, Smith was able to negate Coleman's vaunted ground and pound attacks. After nearly 15 minutes of attempting to damage Smith through his guard, Coleman was exhausted, allowing Smith to capitalize on the feet. Eventually, he won the decision against an exhausted and damaged Coleman.

Smith then successfully defended his belt against David "Tank" Abbott winning after Abbott was too exhausted to continue, before losing his belt to MMA legend Randy Couture by majority decision, in a controversial fight that many viewers deemed as a fight that Smith should have won; especially since Smith was the reigning and defending UFC heavyweight champion.

Return to MMA 
On May 19, 2007 Maurice Smith had his first MMA bout in almost seven years when he defeated Marco Ruas by TKO in a rematch at an International Fight League show held in Chicago. He saved his energy for the first rounds, making little action, before turning to attack and dropping Ruas thrice with striking combinations for the towel throw.

On February 23, 2008 at a Strikeforce event entitled Strikeforce: At The Dome held at the Tacoma Dome in Tacoma, Washington, Smith defeated kickboxer Rick Roufus, who was making his MMA debut, by submission at 1:53 of the first round.

Maurice Smith was the coach of the Seattle Tiger Sharks of the International Fight League from 2006 to 2007. He is currently associated with Team Alliance.

Smith returned to MMA on March 30, 2012 at the second Resurrection Fighting Alliance (RFA) card against Jorge Cordoba, his first career fight as a Light Heavyweight. After spending the first two rounds picking apart Cordoba with various strikes, Maurice finished the fight with a head-kick knockout. He was scheduled to fight Ryan Lopez on June 30, 2012 at Resurrection Fighting Alliance's third event, RFA 3. Weeks before the fight, though, Lopez was forced to pull out of the fight due to an unspecified illness.

Smith returned to the Heavyweight division and lost a unanimous decision to Matt Kovacs at Cage Warrior Combat (CWC) 9 on November 2, 2013.

Championships and accomplishments

Kickboxing 
 K-1
 2001 K-1 World Grand Prix Preliminary USA winner
 K-1 World Grand Prix '93 Tournament Semifinalist
 International Sport Karate Association
 I.S.K.A. World Muay Thai Heavyweight Champion (1996)
 World Kickboxing Association
 W.K.A. World Kickboxing Heavyweight Champion (1983)
 W.K.A. World Muay Thai Heavyweight Champion (1994)
 Other
 W.K.C. Light-Heavyweight World Champion (1983)

Mixed martial arts 
 Ultimate Fighting Championship
 UFC Heavyweight Championship (One time)
 One successful title defense
 UFC Hall of Fame (Pioneer wing, class of 2017)
 Extreme Fighting
 Extreme Fighting Heavyweight Championship 3 Marcus "Conan" Silveira
 Extreme Fighting Heavyweight Championship 4 Murakami Kazanari
 Wrestling Observer Newsletter
 1997 Most Outstanding Fighter
 1997 Fight of the Year vs. Mark Coleman on July 27
 Black Belt Magazine
 2001 Full-Contact Fighter of the Year

Kickboxing record 

|-  bgcolor="#FFBBBB"
| 2005-11-07 || Loss ||align=left| Chris Chrisopoulides || No Respect 3 || Melbourne, Australia || Decision || 3 || 3:00 ||
|-
|-  bgcolor="#FFBBBB"
| 2003-05-02 || Loss ||align=left| Rick Roufus || K-1 World Grand Prix 2003 in Las Vegas Semi Finals || Las Vegas, Nevada, United States || Decision (Unanimous) || 3 || 3:00 ||
|-
|-  bgcolor="#CCFFCC"
| 2003-05-02 || Win ||align=left| Giuseppe DeNatale || K-1 World Grand Prix 2003 in Las Vegas Quarter Finals || Las Vegas, Nevada, United States || Decision (Unanimous) || 3 || 3:00 ||
|-
|-  bgcolor="#CCFFCC"
| 2003-04-06 || Win ||align=left| Tsuyoshi || K-1 Beast 2003 || Yamagata, Yamagata, Japan || Decision (Majority) || 3 || 3:00 ||
|-
|-  bgcolor="#FFBBBB"
| 2001-08-11 || Loss ||align=left| Peter Aerts || K-1 World Grand Prix 2001 in Las Vegas Semi Finals || Las Vegas, Nevada, United States || Ext.R Decision (Unanimous) || 4 || 3:00 ||
|-
|-  bgcolor="#CCFFCC"
| 2001-08-11 || Win ||align=left| Jörgen Kruth || K-1 World Grand Prix 2001 in Las Vegas Quarter Finals || Las Vegas, Nevada, USA || Decision (Unanimous) || 3 || 3:00 ||
|-
|-  bgcolor="#CCFFCC"
| 2001-05-05 || Win ||align=left| Michael McDonald || K-1 World Grand Prix 2001 Preliminary USA Final || Las Vegas, Nevada, United States || Ext.R Decision (Split) || 4 || 3:00 ||
|-
! style=background:white colspan=9 |
|-
|-  bgcolor="#CCFFCC"
| 2001-05-05 || Win ||align=left| Gunter Singer || K-1 World Grand Prix 2001 Preliminary USA Semi Finals || Las Vegas, Nevada, United States || KO (Right punch) || 2 || 0:24 ||
|-
|-  bgcolor="#CCFFCC"
| 2001-05-05 || Win ||align=left| Pedro Fernandez || K-1 World Grand Prix 2001 Preliminary USA Quarter Finals || Las Vegas, Nevada, United States || Decision (Unanimous) || 3 || 3:00 ||
|-
|-  bgcolor="#FFBBBB"
| 1999-08-22 || Loss ||align=left| Andy Hug || K-1 Spirits '99 || Tokyo, Japan || Decision (Unanimous) || 5 || 3:00 ||
|-
|-  bgcolor="#FFBBBB"
| 1999-06-06 || Loss ||align=left| Peter Aerts || K-1 Survival '99 || Sapporo, Japan || TKO (Corner stoppage) || 3 || 2:44 ||
|-
|-  bgcolor="#FFBBBB"
| 1998-09-27 || Loss ||align=left| Mike Bernardo || K-1 World Grand Prix '98 Opening Round || Osaka, Japan || Decision (Unanimous) || 5 || 3:00 ||
|-
! style=background:white colspan=9 |
|-
|-  bgcolor="#FFBBBB"
| 1998-08-07 || Loss ||align=left| Ernesto Hoost || K-1 USA Grand Prix '98 || Las Vegas, Nevada, United States || Decision (Unanimous) || 5 || 3:00 ||
|-
|-  bgcolor="#c5d2ea"
| 1998-05-24 || Draw ||align=left| Jean-Claude Leuyer || Draka V || Los Angeles, California, United States || Decision Draw || || ||
|-
! style=background:white colspan=9 |
|-
|-  bgcolor="#c5d2ea"
| 1998-04-09 || Draw ||align=left| Masaaki Satake || K-1 Kings '98 || Yokohama, Japan || Decision Draw || 5 || 3:00 ||
|-
|-  bgcolor="#FFBBBB"
| 1997-02-01 || Loss ||align=left| Jérôme Le Banner || Le Choc des Champions || Paris, France || Decision || 5 || 3:00 ||
|-
! style=background:white colspan=9 |
|-
|-  bgcolor="#CCFFCC"
| 1994-07-30 || Win ||align=left| Frank Lobman || AJKF Destiny VII || Nagoya, Japan || KO (Left high kick) || 3 || ||
|-
! style=background:white colspan=9 |
|-
|-  bgcolor="#CCFFCC"
| 1993-12-04 || Win ||align=left| Alex Desir || || Las Vegas, Nevada, United States || KO (Punch) || 10 ||  ||
|-
! style=background:white colspan=9 |
|-
|-  bgcolor="#CCFFCC"
| 1993-11-08 || Win ||align=left| Minoru Suzuki || Pancrase: Yes, We Are Hybrid Wrestlers 3 || Kobe, Japan || KO (Right hook) || 3 || 0:52 ||
|-
|-  bgcolor="#FFBBBB"
| 1993-04-30 || Loss ||align=left| Ernesto Hoost || K-1 Grand Prix '93 Semi Finals || Tokyo, Japan || KO (Left high kick) || 3 || 1:18 ||
|-
|-  bgcolor="#CCFFCC"
| 1993-04-30 || Win ||align=left| Toshiyuki Atokawa || K-1 Grand Prix '93 Quarter Finals || Tokyo, Japan || Decision (Unanimous) || 3 || 3:00 ||
|-
|-  bgcolor="#CCFFCC"
| 1993-03-27 || Win ||align=left| Marcus Fuckner || All Japan Kickboxing Federation || Tokyo, Japan || KO || 5 ||  ||
|-
|-  bgcolor="#FFBBBB"
| 1993-03-07 || Loss ||align=left| Peter Aerts || The Night of the Shock || Amsterdam, Netherlands || KO (Right high kick) || 4 || 2:07 ||
|-
|-  bgcolor="#FFBBBB"
| 1992-04-09 || Loss ||align=left| Peter Aerts || || Paris, France || Decision || 9 || 2:00 ||
|-
|-  bgcolor="#CCFFCC"
| 1992-03-16 || Win ||align=left| Steven Kruwell || World Martial Arts Challenge || Las Vegas, Nevada, United States || TKO (Low kicks) || 2 || 1:41 ||
|-
! style=background:white colspan=9 |
|-
|-  bgcolor="#CCFFCC"
| 1991 || Win ||align=left| Stan Longinidis || || Sydney, Australia || Decision (Split) || 12 || 2:00 ||
|-
! style=background:white colspan=9 |
|-
|-  bgcolor="#CCFFCC"
| 1991-06-29 || Win ||align=left| Andre Mannaart || Thriller from Paris I || Paris, France || KO || 2 || ||
|-
|-  bgcolor="#CCFFCC"
| 1991-05-26 || Win ||align=left| Peter Smit || "Soar Into Space" Chapter III || Tokyo, Japan || KO || 5 ||1:13 || 38-3-3
|-
|-  bgcolor="#CCFFCC"
| 1991-03-30 || Win ||align=left| Kees Bessems || "Soar Into Space" Chapter II || Tokyo, Japan || KO || 1 || ||
|-
|-  bgcolor="#CCFFCC"
| 1990-12-09 || Win ||align=left| Kees Bessems || Sammi Kebchi Promotion || France, Paris || KO || 2 || ||
|-  bgcolor="#CCFFCC"
|-
| 1990-09-09 || Win ||align=left| Floyd Brown ||  "Inspiring Wars Heat-928"  || Tokyo, Japan || Decision (Unanimous) || 5 || 3:00 ||
|-
|-  bgcolor="#CCFFCC"
| 1990-01-20 || Win ||align=left| Kevin Rosier || "Inspiring Wars" 1 || Tokyo, Japan || KO || 2 || || 33-3-3
|-
! style=background:white colspan=9 |
|-
|-  bgcolor="#CCFFCC"
| 1987-09-05 || Win ||align=left| Steve Tremblay || All Japan Kickboxing Federation "Super Fight 2" || Tokyo, Japan || KO || 5 || ||
|-
! style=background:white colspan=9 |
|-
|-  bgcolor="#CCFFCC"
| 1987 || Win ||align=left| Dino Homsey || || || || || ||
|-
! style=background:white colspan=9 |
|-
|-  bgcolor="#CCFFCC"
| 1987 || Win ||align=left| Bill Morrison || || Las Vegas, Nevada, United States || TKO (Low kicks) || 8 || 0:55 ||
|-
! style=background:white colspan=9 |
|-
|-  bgcolor="#CCFFCC"
| 1986 || Win ||align=left| Raymond Horsey || || Atlanta, Georgia, USA || KO (Low Kicks) ||  ||  ||
|-
! style=background:white colspan=9 |
|-
|-  bgcolor="#CCFFCC"
| 1984 || Win ||align=left| Marcel Schwank || || Netherlands || KO || 1 ||  ||
|-
|-  bgcolor="#CCFFCC"
| 1983 || Win ||align=left| Dana Goodson || || || || || ||
|-
! style=background:white colspan=9 |
|-
|-  bgcolor="#CCFFCC"
| 1983 || Win ||align=left| Travis Everett || || Mexico City, Mexico || KO (Low Kicks) || || || 13-2
|-
! style=background:white colspan=9 |
|-
|-  bgcolor="#CCFFCC"
| 1983 || Win ||align=left|
Bob Smith
 || || || ||  ||  || 12-2
|-
|-  bgcolor="#FFBBBB"
| 1983-05-21 || Loss ||align=left| Don Wilson || || Tokyo, Japan || Decision || 11 || 2:00 || 11-2
|-
! style=background:white colspan=9 |
|-
|-  bgcolor="#CCFFCC"
| 1983-00-00 || Win ||align=left| || || || ||  ||  || 11-1
|-
|-  bgcolor="#CCFFCC"
| 1983-00-00 || Win ||align=left| Tony Morelli  || || Hawaii, United States || KO (Kick) || 7 || || 10-1
|-
! style=background:white colspan=9 |
|-
|-  bgcolor="#CCFFCC"
| 1983-00-00 || Win ||align=left| Don Nakaya Nielsen || || Las Vegas, Nevada, United States || Decision || 7 || 2:00 || 9-1
|-
|-  bgcolor="#FFBBBB"
| 1983-00-00 || Loss ||align=left| Tony Morelli || || Surrey, Canada || Decision || 7 || 2:00 || 8-1
|-
! style=background:white colspan=9 |
|-
|-  bgcolor="#CCFFCC"
| 1981-00-00 || Win ||align=left| Marcus Ector || || Everett, WASHINGTON || KO ||  ||  || 7-0
|-
|-  bgcolor="#CCFFCC"
| 1981-00-00 || Win ||align=left| Pat Peters || || Surrey, Canada || KO ||  ||  || 6-0
|-
|-  bgcolor="#CCFFCC"
| 1981-00-00 || Win ||align=left| Scott Rohr || || Portland, OR || KO ||  ||  || 5-0
|-
|-  bgcolor="#CCFFCC"
| 1981-00-00 || Win ||align=left| Ken Orr || || Everett, WASHINGTON || KO ||  ||  || 4-0
|-
|-  bgcolor="#CCFFCC"
| 1981-02-26 || Win ||align=left| Wade Woodbury || ||Vancouver, British Columbia, Canada || Decision (Split) ||  ||  || 3-0
|-
|-  bgcolor="#CCFFCC"
| 1981-01-17 || Win ||align=left| Rich Mason || || Everett, WASHINGTON || KO ||  ||  || 2-0
|-
|-  bgcolor="#CCFFCC"
| 1980-09-20 || Win ||align=left| Kelly Worden || || Tacoma, WASHINGTON  || KO ||  ||  || 1-0
|-
| colspan=9 | Legend:

Mixed martial arts record 

|-
| Loss
| align=center| 14–14
| Matt Kovacs
| Decision (unanimous)
| CWC 9: Cage Warrior Combat 9
| 
| align=center| 3
| align=center| 5:00
| Kent, Washington, United States
| 
|-
| Win
| align=center| 14–13
| Jorge Cordoba
| KO (head kick)
| RFA 2: Yvel vs. Alexander
| 
| align=center| 3
| align=center| 2:05
| Kearney, Nebraska, United States
| 
|- 
| Loss
| align=center| 13–13
| Hidehiko Yoshida
| Submission (neck crank)
| World Victory Road Presents: Sengoku 3
| 
| align=center| 1
| align=center| 2:23
| Saitama, Japan
|
|-
| Win
| align=center| 13–12
| Rick Roufus
| Submission (straight armbar)
| Strikeforce: At The Dome
| 
| align=center| 1
| align=center| 1:53
| Tacoma, Washington, United States
|
|-
| Win
| align=center| 12–12
| Marco Ruas
| TKO (corner stoppage)
| IFL: Chicago
| 
| align=center| 4
| align=center| 3:43
| Chicago, Illinois, United States
| 
|-
| Loss
| align=center| 11–12
| Renato Sobral
| Decision (unanimous)
| UFC 28
| 
| align=center| 3
| align=center| 5:00
| Atlantic City, New Jersey, United States
|
|-
| Win
| align=center| 11–11
| Bobby Hoffman
| Decision (majority)
| UFC 27
| 
| align=center| 3
| align=center| 5:00
| New Orleans, Louisiana, United States
| 
|-
| Loss
| align=center| 10–11
| Renzo Gracie
| Submission (straight armbar)
| RINGS: King of Kings 1999 Block B
| 
| align=center| 1
| align=center| 0:50
| Tokyo, Japan
| 
|-
| Win
| align=center| 10–10
| Branden Lee Hinkle
| Decision (majority)
| RINGS: King of Kings 1999 Block B
| 
| align=center| 2
| align=center| 5:00
| Tokyo, Japan
| 
|-
| Loss
| align=center| 9–10
| Marcus Silveira
| Submission (arm-triangle choke)
| WEF 7: Stomp in the Swamp
| 
| align=center| 2
| align=center| 2:48
| Kenner, Louisiana, United States
| 
|-
| Win
| align=center| 9–9
| Branko Cikatic
| Submission (forearm choke)
| Pride 7
| 
| align=center| 1
| align=center| 7:33
| Yokohama, Japan
| 
|-
| Win
| align=center| 8–9
| Marco Ruas
| TKO (corner stoppage)
| UFC 21
| 
| align=center| 1
| align=center| 5:00
| Cedar Rapids, Iowa, United States
| 
|-
| Loss
| align=center| 7–9
| Kevin Randleman
| Decision (unanimous)
| UFC 19
| 
| align=center| 1
| align=center| 15:00
| Bay St. Louis, Mississippi, United States
|
|-
| Loss
| align=center| 7–8
| Randy Couture
| Decision (majority)
| UFC Japan
| 
| align=center| 1
| align=center| 21:00
| Yokohama, Japan
| 
|-
| Win
| align=center| 7–7
| Tank Abbott
| TKO (leg kicks)
| UFC 15
| 
| align=center| 1
| align=center| 8:08
| Bay St. Louis, Mississippi, United States
| 
|-
| Win
| align=center| 6–7
| Mark Coleman
| Decision (unanimous)
| UFC 14
| 
| align=center| 1
| align=center| 21:00
| Birmingham, Alabama, United States
| 
|-
| Win
| align=center| 5–7
| Kazunari Murakami
| KO (punch)
| Extreme Fighting 4
| 
| align=center| 1
| align=center| 4:23
| Des Moines, Iowa, United States
|  
|-
| Loss
| align=center| 4–7
| Akira Maeda
| N/A
| RINGS: Budokan Hall 1997
| 
| align=center| N/A
| align=center| N/A
| Tokyo, Japan
| 
|-
| Win
| align=center| 4–6
| Marcus Silveira
| TKO (head kick)
| Extreme Fighting 3
| 
| align=center| 3
| align=center| 1:36
| Tulsa, Oklahoma, United States
|  
|-
| Loss
| align=center| 3–6
| Kiyoshi Tamura
| Submission (armbar)
| RINGS: Maelstrom 6
| 
| align=center| 1
| align=center| 10:58
| Tokyo, Japan
| 
|-
| Loss
| align=center| 3–5
| Tsuyoshi Kohsaka
| N/A
| RINGS: Budokan Hall 1996
| 
| align=center| N/A
| align=center| N/A
| Tokyo, Japan
|
|-
| Loss
| align=center| 3–4
| Bas Rutten
| Submission (rear-naked choke)
| Pancrase: Eyes Of Beast 6
| 
| align=center| 1
| align=center| 4:34
| Yokohama, Japan
|
|-
| Win
| align=center| 3–3
| Manabu Yamada
| KO (punch)
| Pancrase: 1995 Anniversary Show
| 
| align=center| 2
| align=center| 1:46
| Tokyo, Japan
|
|-
| Loss
| align=center| 2–3
| Bas Rutten
| Submission (kneebar)
| Pancrase: Eyes Of Beast 4
| 
| align=center| 1
| align=center| 2:10
| Chiba, Japan
|
|-
| Loss
| align=center| 2–2
| Ken Shamrock
| Submission (arm-triangle choke)
| Pancrase: King of Pancrase Tournament Opening Round
| 
| align=center| 1
| align=center| 4:23
| Tokyo, Japan
|
|-
| Win
| align=center| 2–1
| Takaku Fuke
| KO (knee)
| Pancrase: King of Pancrase Tournament Opening Round
| 
| align=center| 1
| align=center| 2:48
| Tokyo, Japan
| 
|-
| Loss
| align=center| 1–1
| Minoru Suzuki
| Submission (armbar)
| Pancrase: Road to the Championship 1
| 
| align=center| 3
| align=center| 0:36
| Tokyo, Japan
| 
|-
| Win
| align=center| 1–0
| Minoru Suzuki
| KO (punch)
| UWF U-Cosmos
| 
| align=center| 4
| align=center| 1:05
| Tokyo, Japan
| 
|-

References

External links 
 
 
 
 Profile at K-1

1961 births
Living people
American male mixed martial artists
African-American boxers
African-American mixed martial artists
Mixed martial artists from Washington (state)
Heavyweight mixed martial artists
Mixed martial artists utilizing kickboxing
American male kickboxers
Kickboxers from Washington (state)
Light heavyweight kickboxers
Heavyweight kickboxers
Ultimate Fighting Championship champions
American male boxers
Ultimate Fighting Championship male fighters
West Seattle High School alumni
21st-century African-American people
20th-century African-American sportspeople